José Roberto Gama de Oliveira (born 16 February 1964), known as Bebeto, is a Brazilian former professional football player who played as a forward. He entered politics in the 2010 Brazilian General Elections and was elected to the Legislative Assembly of Rio de Janeiro representing the Democratic Labour Party.

With 39 goals in 75 appearances for Brazil, Bebeto is the sixth highest goalscorer for his national team. He was the top scorer for Brazil at the 1989 Copa América when they won the tournament. At the 1994 FIFA World Cup, he formed a formidable strike partnership with Romário to lead Brazil to a record fourth World Cup title. He also generated headlines at the tournament for his goal celebration where he began rocking an imaginary baby after scoring against the Netherlands; his wife had given birth to their third child just days before. He was also a member of the Brazilian team that won the 1997 FIFA Confederations Cup, while he won Olympic silver and bronze medals with Brazil at the 1988 and 1996 Summer Olympic Games respectively. In 1989, Bebeto was named South American Footballer of the Year.

In January 2013 and August 2014, Bebeto was named as one of the six Ambassadors of the 2014 FIFA World Cup and Rio 2016 in Brazil, others being Ronaldo, Amarildo, Marta, Carlos Alberto Torres, Mário Zagallo.

Early career

Bebeto, who was born in Salvador, Bahia, started his career in 1983 with Vitória.

Club career
He played for Flamengo, Vasco da Gama, Cruzeiro and Botafogo in Brazil, Deportivo La Coruña and Sevilla in Spain, Toros Neza in Mexico, Kashima Antlers in Japan, and Al Ittihad in Saudi Arabia, finally retiring in 2002.

Deportivo La Coruña
Bebeto spent four years in Spain at Deportivo La Coruña, scoring an impressive 86 goals in 131 games. Bebeto became the top scorer in La Liga in his first season at Deportivo, scoring 29 goals in the 1992–93 season. In the next season, 1993–94 season, Deportivo had the chance to win their first ever La Liga title by beating Valencia in the last match of the season. In a very evenly matched contest Deportivo had a golden opportunity to seal the victory and thus the league title. They were given a penalty kick just minutes from the end. The official penalty taker all season had been Bebeto (after Donato, who wasn't in the field), who this time, refused to take the penalty. Eventually, Miroslav Đukić took the penalty and failed to score; hence, the match ended with a 0–0 draw, effectively handing Barcelona the title.

Later career
In 1996 Bebeto returned to play for native club Flamengo, but after just 15 games, Bebeto returned to Spain to play for Sevilla, for whom he never scored. In 1997, Bebeto joined Cruzeiro for just one match, the 1997 Intercontinental Cup final against Borussia Dortmund. Despite his presence, the Belo Horizonte side lost the match 2–0. Bebeto returned to goalscoring form at native clubs Vitória in late 1997 and Botafogo in early 1998, which saw him being picked for Brazil's World Cup defence in 1998.

In 2001, he was rejected by Scottish side St Mirren, who were willing to pay his wages but had reservations about his fitness. On 5 September 2002, he joined his final club at the age of 38, Al-Ittihad of Saudi Arabia, after pledging to join Vasco da Gama on 28 August.

International career
For Brazil, Bebeto scored 39 goals in 75 caps after making his debut in 1985. He played in three World Cups: 1990, 1994, and 1998. In 1994, he was one of the best players of the tournament, scoring three goals and providing two assists for the eventual champions, and then repeated the feat four years later as Brazil finished second to hosts France.

During the 1994 World Cup, Bebeto formed a formidable partnership with Romário, after they succeeded in putting their personal differences aside. Bebeto and Romário were fierce rivals in the Spanish League. Bebeto led the Spanish first division with 29 goals in 1992–93 and Romário led it with 30 goals in 1993–94. It was Romário who gave Bebeto the nickname Chorao, or Crybaby, for his habit of pouting to referees. It was also Romário who called a news conference before the World Cup to announce that he would not sit next to Bebeto on the team's flight to the United States. Today, however, Bebeto and Romario are friends, with Bebeto claiming that they talk often. In an interview in 2018, Bebeto praised his partnership with Romario: "I played with Romario only in the national team. We played only one game together at Flamengo before he left for Europe. Do you know that Brazil have never lost a game when Bebeto and Romario played together? Not a single game! Besides, every time we played together at least one of us scored."

Bebeto became a household name for his goal celebration in the 1994 World Cup in the United States. His wife had delivered their third child just days before a quarter-final match against the Netherlands in the scorching heat of Dallas. After scoring, Bebeto ran to the sideline, brought his arms together and began rocking an imaginary baby. Teammates Romário and Mazinho quickly joined in. That child, a boy who was named Mattheus, started his football career with the youth side of Brazilian club Flamengo.

He won a silver medal for Brazil in the 1988 Summer Olympics. He was later chosen to be an over-23 player at the 1996 Summer Olympics, scoring a hat-trick in the Bronze medal match against Portugal.

On 8 December 2012 a friendly match was played by Brazil Masters vs IFA All Stars at Salt Lake Stadium, Kolkata, India. Bebeto scored a goal for Brazil Masters as they defeated All Stars by 3–1.

Style of play
Regarded one of Brazil's greatest strikers, Bebeto was a prolific goalscorer and an excellent finisher, who was known for his consistency and determination throughout his career, although he was also injury-prone and was criticised for his character. Despite not being imposing physically due to his lack of height and slender physique, he was a fast and opportunistic player, who used his agility, offensive movement, and intelligence to lose his markers in tight spaces. Due to his vision, outstanding technical skills, close control on the ball, and his ability to play off other strikers and provide them with assists, he was often employed as a playmaking attacking midfielder or as a supporting striker early on in his career, drawing influence from Zico's playing style. He was later deployed as a striker or as a centre-forward, however, where he excelled, due to his eye for goal, and remained in this position for the rest of his career.

Coaching career
Bebeto was hired on 16 December 2009 as the América Football Club's head coach. After an average performance at the Taça Guanabara, he was sacked on 13 February 2010. He had a record of three wins, one draw and four losses.

Personal life
Bebeto is married to Denise Oliveira, who played volleyball for Flamengo in 1988, with whom he has two sons and one daughter, Stéphannie who is married to Carlos Eduardo. His son, Mattheus, is a professional footballer. Bebeto's brother-in-law, Luiz Fernando Petra, was murdered in 2002, during a federal deputy election in Rio de Janeiro.

Media
Bebeto features in EA Sports' FIFA video game series; he was on the cover of certain editions of FIFA 97.

Career statistics

Club

International 

Scores and results list Brazil's goal tally first, score column indicates score after each Bebeto goal.

Honours
Flamengo
 Campeonato Brasileiro Série A: 1983, 1987
 Campeonato Carioca: 1986
 Taça Guanabara: 1984, 1988, 1989

Vasco da Gama
 Campeonato Brasileiro Série A: 1989
 Taça Guanabara: 1990

Deportivo La Coruña
 Copa del Rey: 1994–95
 Supercopa de España: 1995

Botafogo
 Torneio Rio-São Paulo: 1998

Kashima Antlers
 J League: 2000
 Emperor's Cup: 2000
 J.League Cup: 2000

Brazil U20
 FIFA U-20 World Cup: 1983

Brazil U23
 Pan American Games: 1987
 Olympic Games Silver medal: 1988; Bronze medal: 1996

Brazil
 FIFA World Cup: 1994
 Copa América: 1989
 FIFA Confederations Cup: 1997

Individual
 Campeonato Carioca top scorer: 1988, 1989
 Copa América top scorer: 1989
 South American Footballer of the Year: 1989
 South American Team of the Year: 1989
 Bola de Prata: 1992
 Campeonato Brasileiro Série A top scorer: 1992
 Pichichi Trophy: 1992–93
 Olympic Games top scorer: 1996
 Torneio Rio-São Paulo top scorer: 1999
 World Soccer: The 100 Greatest Footballers of All Time
 Brazilian Football Museum Hall of Fame

References

External links

 

1964 births
Living people
1989 Copa América players
1990 FIFA World Cup players
1994 FIFA World Cup players
1997 FIFA Confederations Cup players
1998 FIFA World Cup players
Botafogo de Futebol e Regatas players
Brazil international footballers
Brazil under-20 international footballers
Brazilian expatriate footballers
Brazilian expatriate sportspeople in Japan
Brazilian expatriate sportspeople in Saudi Arabia
Brazilian expatriate sportspeople in Spain
Brazilian emigrants to Spain
Brazilian footballers
Brazilian football managers
Campeonato Brasileiro Série A players
CR Vasco da Gama players
CR Flamengo footballers
Deportivo de La Coruña players
Esporte Clube Vitória players
Expatriate footballers in Japan
Expatriate footballers in Saudi Arabia
Copa América-winning players
FIFA Confederations Cup-winning players
FIFA World Cup-winning players
Association football forwards
Footballers at the 1988 Summer Olympics
Footballers at the 1996 Summer Olympics
J1 League players
Kashima Antlers players
La Liga players
Naturalised citizens of Spain
Olympic footballers of Brazil
Olympic silver medalists for Brazil
Olympic bronze medalists for Brazil
Sportspeople from Salvador, Bahia
Sevilla FC players
Pichichi Trophy winners
South American Footballer of the Year winners
Olympic medalists in football
Toros Neza footballers
Ittihad FC players
Expatriate footballers in Spain
Expatriate footballers in Mexico
Brazilian expatriate sportspeople in Mexico
Liga MX players
Medalists at the 1996 Summer Olympics
Medalists at the 1988 Summer Olympics
Saudi Professional League players